Aristaea vietnamella is a moth of the family Gracillariidae. It is known from Vietnam.

References

Aristaea
Moths described in 2001